A baleada is a traditional Central American dish, believed to have originated on the northern coast of Honduras.  It is composed of a flour tortilla, filled with a smear of mashed "refried" red beans (a variety of bean native to Central and South America), crema (mantequilla blanca), and crumbled queso duro (salty hard cheese). This is usually called baleada sencilla (simple baleada). Other ingredients may include scrambled eggs, avocados, meat, or plantains.

See also
 Phaseolus vulgaris
 Black turtle bean
 Honduran cuisine

References

Honduran cuisine
Tortilla-based dishes